The Child Trust Funds Act 2004 (c 6) is an Act of the Parliament of the United Kingdom.

Introductory

Section 2 - Eligible children
The words "and before 3rd January 2011" were inserted after "31st August 2002" in section 2(1) by section 1(2) of the Savings Accounts and Health in Pregnancy Grant Act 2010.

Section 2(5)(b) was substituted by paragraph 1 of Schedule 2 to the Immigration (European Economic Area) (Amendment) Regulations 2009 (SI 2009/1117).

Sections 2(5A) to (5C) were inserted by section 1(3) of the Savings Accounts and Health in Pregnancy Grant Act 2010. The words "or (5B)(a)" were inserted after "subsection (1)(a)" in section 2(6) by section 1(4) of the Savings Accounts and Health in Pregnancy Grant Act 2010.

Section 3 - Requirements to be satisfied
Sections 3(6)(a) and (b) were substituted by section 61(2) of the Deregulation Act 2015.

The words "under 16" where they first occurred in section 3(8), and the words "under 16" in section 3(10), were repealed by sections 61(3) and (4) of the Deregulation Act 2015.

Sections 3(11A) and (11B) were inserted by section 60(3) of the Deregulation Act 2015.

Opening and transfers

Section 7A - Transfers to other accounts for children
This section was inserted by section 62(2) of the Deregulation Act 2015.

Section 7B - Transfers on child reaching 18
This section was inserted by section 62(3) of the Deregulation Act 2015.

Powers to safeguard interests of children
This cross heading was inserted by section 63 of the Deregulation Act 2015.

Section 7C
This section was inserted by section 63 of the Deregulation Act 2015.

Contributions and subscriptions

Section 9 - Supplementary contribution by Inland Revenue
The reference to income support in section 9(8)(a) was removed by  paragraph 15 of Schedule 2 to the Welfare Reform Act 2009.

Tax

Section 14 - Insurance companies and friendly societies
This section was repealed by Part 2(7) of Schedule 27 to the Finance Act 2007.

The Child Trust Funds (Insurance Companies) Regulations 2004 (SI 2004/2680) were made under section 333B of the Income and Corporation Taxes Act 1988 as extended by section 14(1) of this Act.

Information etc.

Section 15 - Information from account providers etc.
Section 15(2) was repealed by paragraph 12(3) of Schedule to the Finance Act 2009, Section 96 and Schedule 48 (Appointed Day, Savings and Consequential Amendments) Order 2009 (SI 2009/3054) (C 133).

Penalties

Section 21 - Decisions, appeals, mitigation and recovery
New sections 21(10) to (10C) were substituted for section 21(10) by paragraph 415(3) of Schedule 1 to the Transfer of Tribunal Functions and Revenue and Customs Appeals Order 2009 (SI 2009/56).

Section 23 - Exercise of rights of appeal
Section 23(3) was substituted by paragraph 416(2) of Schedule 1 to the Transfer of Tribunal Functions and Revenue and Customs Appeals Order 2009. Sections 23(4) and (5) were repealed by paragraph 416(3) of Schedule 1 to the Transfer of Tribunal Functions and Revenue and Customs Appeals Order 2009. Section 23(6) was substituted by paragraph 416(4) of Schedule 1 to the Transfer of Tribunal Functions and Revenue and Customs Appeals Order 2009. Section 23(7) was repealed by paragraph 416(5) of Schedule 1 to the Transfer of Tribunal Functions and Revenue and Customs Appeals Order 2009.

Section 24
This section was repealed by paragraph 417 of Schedule 1 to the Transfer of Tribunal Functions and Revenue and Customs Appeals Order 2009.

Supplementary

Section 27 - Commencement
The following orders have been made under this section:
The Child Trust Funds Act 2004 (Commencement No. 1) Order 2004 (S.I. 2004/2422 (C. 103))
The Child Trust Funds Act 2004 (Commencement No. 2) Order 2004 (S.I. 2004/3369 (C. 158))

Section 29 - Interpretation
The definition of "appropriate tribunal" was inserted by paragraph 418(2) of Schedule 1 to the Transfer of Tribunal Functions and Revenue and Customs Appeals Order 2009. The definition of "the General Commissioners" was repealed by paragraph 418(3) of Schedule 1 to the Transfer of Tribunal Functions and Revenue and Customs Appeals Order 2009. The definition of "Northern Ireland Social Security Commissioner" was inserted by paragraph 418(4) of Schedule 1 to the Transfer of Tribunal Functions and Revenue and Customs Appeals Order 2009. The definition of "the Special Commissioners" was repealed by paragraph 418(3) of Schedule 1 to the Transfer of Tribunal Functions and Revenue and Customs Appeals Order 2009.

The Child Trust Funds Regulations 2004
The Child Trust Funds Regulations 2004 (SI 2004/1450) were made under this Act.

Those regulations are amended by the following regulations, also made under this Act:
The Child Trust Funds (Amendment) Regulations 2004 (SI 2004/2676)
The Child Trust Funds (Amendment No. 2) Regulations 2004 (SI 2004/3382)
The Child Trust Funds (Amendment) Regulations 2005 (SI 2005/383)
The Child Trust Funds (Amendment No. 2) Regulations 2005 (SI 2005/909)
The Child Trust Funds (Amendment No. 3) Regulations 2005 (SI 2005/3349)
The Child Trust Funds (Amendment) Regulations 2006 (SI 2006/199)
The Child Trust Funds (Amendment No. 2) Regulations 2006 (SI 2006/2684)
The Child Trust Funds (Amendment No. 3) Regulations 2006 (SI 2006/3195)
The Child Trust Funds (Amendment) Regulations 2009 (SI 2009/475)
The Child Trust Funds (Amendment No. 2) Regulations 2009 (SI 2009/694)
The Child Trust Funds (Amendment) Regulations 2010 (SI 2010/582)
The Child Trust Funds (Amendment No. 2) Regulations 2010 (SI 2010/836)
The Child Trust Funds (Amendment No. 3) Regulations 2010 (SI 2010/1894)
The Child Trust Funds (Amendment No. 4) Regulations 2010 (SI 2010/2599)

References
"Child Trust Funds Act 2004". Halsbury's Statutes of England and Wales. Fourth Edition. LexisNexis. 2009 Reissue. Volume 6(2). Page 452.
"Child Trust Funds Act 2004". Current Law Statutes 2004. Sweet & Maxwell. London. W Green. Edinburgh. 2005. Volume 1. Chapter 6.

External links
The Child Trust Funds Act 2004, as amended from the National Archives.
The Child Trust Funds Act 2004, as originally enacted from the National Archives.
Explanatory notes to the Child Trust Funds Act 2004.

Child welfare in the United Kingdom
United Kingdom Acts of Parliament 2004